Inchcolm Abbey is a medieval abbey located on the island of Inchcolm in the Firth of Forth in Scotland. The Abbey, which is located at the centre of the island, was founded in the 12th century during the episcopate of Gregoir, Bishop of Dunkeld. Later tradition placed it even earlier, in the reign of King Alexander I of Scotland (1107–24), who had taken shelter on Incholm when his ship was forced ashore during a storm in 1123. It is said he resided there for three days with the Hermit of Incholm.

The Abbey was first used as a priory by Augustinian canons regular, becoming a full abbey in 1235. The island was attacked by the English from 1296 onwards, and the Abbey was abandoned after the Scottish Reformation in 1560. It has since been used for defensive purposes, as it is situated in a strategically important position in the middle of the Firth of Forth. A Latin inscription carved above the Abbey's entrance reads:

Translated, it has been rendered thus:

Inchcolm Abbey has the most complete surviving remains of any Scottish monastic house. The cloisters, chapter house, warming house, and refectory are all complete, and most of the remaining claustral buildings survive in a largely complete state. The least well-preserved part of the complex is the monastic church. The ruins are cared for by Historic Environment Scotland, which also maintains a visitor centre near the landing pier (entrance charge; ferry from South Queensferry).

In July 1581 stones from the abbey were taken to Edinburgh to repair the Tolbooth.

Among the Abbots of Inchcolm was the 15th-century chronicler Walter Bower.

Inchcolm Antiphoner
The Abbey gives its name to the 14th-century manuscript referred to as the Inchcolm Antiphoner. It contains one of the few remaining examples of Celtic Plainchant. Pages of the Antiphoner can be accessed online in facsimile from the University of Edinburgh.

The Antiphoner contains a substantial number of chants dedicated to Saint Columba. While these may derive from a variety of other monastic foundations with Columban associations, such as Oronsay Priory or Iona, Inchcolm is considered the most likely source of the manuscript's compilation, if not composition.

Fictional Settings
William Shakespeare referenced Incholm Abbey in his play Macbeth, 1606.
William Clinkenbeard wrote the novel The Battle of Incholm Abbey, 2012.

See also
 Abbot of Inchcolm, for a list of priors and abbots of the community
 Walter Bower, the most famous abbot
 Abbeys and priories in Scotland, for a general list of Scottish monasteries

References

External links
Historic Environment Scotland's page on the abbey
Cyberscotia's page on the island - including maps, drawings, and photographs

Augustinian monasteries in Scotland
Category A listed buildings in Fife
Listed monasteries in Scotland
Scheduled Ancient Monuments in Fife
Religious museums in Scotland
Museums in Fife
1609 disestablishments
1147 establishments in Scotland
Historic Environment Scotland properties
Ruined abbeys and monasteries
Ruins in Fife
Former Christian monasteries in Scotland